Raja Syed Irfan Ali Choudhury was the 11th monarch of the quasi-princely state of Tarakote in Odisha. He's known for the wide social reforms that he had brought in the state. He was a staunch supporter of female education and had undertaken active steps to impart formal education to girls. He built the first girls school in Jajpur district in 1886.

Early life 

Miyanzada Syed Irfan Ali was born on 21 January 1869 into the ruling family of Tarakote State to Raja Miyan Syed Nurrudin Ali Choudhury. At the age of 8 he contracted small pox which took away his vision. At the age of 27, upon his father's death, he ascended the throne to become the 11th ruler of Tarakote State.

Reign 

Raja Miyan Irfan Ali lost a majority of villages of Tarakote State to the British under the land revenue settlement act. Some of the villages were even auctioned and sold out to outsiders by the British Government 
During his great grandfather's reign, a major portion of Tarakote State was annexed by the Marathas and a new state called Pacchikote was created. The newly crowned Raja of Pacchikote, a contemporary of Raja Irfan is said to have fought a bloody battle against Tarakote near the  Purbakot haat, Kantor. It is said that Raja Irfan Ali had participated in the war himself and had defeated the Raja of Pacchikote. In popular opinion it is believed that, one fine night the Diwan of the Raja of Pacchikote was returning to Pacchikote Garh with some essential commodities, he happened to cross Tarakote State. The soldiers of Tarakote Raj mistook him to be a dacoit and arrested him for intruding the state's borders. The Raja of Pacchikote got furious at this and attacked Tarakote state. Raja Syed Irfan Ali was successfully able to defend the state with the help of the Pathan soldiers from Bhadrak.

Social Reforms 
Raja Irfan Ali promoted female education, he himself was a great patron of Arabic and Odia languages. In 1880 he commissioned Jajpur's first girls school. He was successfully able to suppress the Qazis voice who was against the idea of starting a 'girls school'. In 1886, the school was constructed and opened to impart education to girls. Presently it is known as Tarakote girl's school Makhtab.

References

People from Odisha
Indian monarchs